Jürgen Duah (born 19 December 1985) is a German football defender who played in the 3. Liga for SC Preußen Münster.

Career statistics

References

External links
 

1985 births
Living people
Association football defenders
SG Wattenscheid 09 players
VfL Bochum II players
SC Preußen Münster players
3. Liga players
German footballers
Footballers from Dortmund